Francis Legge (c.1719-15 May 1783), was a British military officer and colonial official in Nova Scotia during the 18th century. He served as Governor of Nova Scotia from 1772 to 1776. During the American Revolution, Legge raised the Royal Nova Scotia Volunteer Regiment.

Legge had served in the territory during the Seven Years' War "without distinction or promotion". However, Legge happened to be a relative of the Earl of Dartmouth.

Major Legge was appointed vice-roy of Nova Scotia by Colonial Secretary William Legge, 2nd Earl of Dartmouth in 1773. He arrived in Halifax on the Adamant on 6 October 1773 with order to determine what were the financial difficulties in Nova Scotia and cure them. He proceeded to cut unnecessary expenses while trying to keep the province loyal to Britain. According to one account:

Legge's actions, particularly an attempt to audit the province's accounts, earned him a growing number of opponents among the local merchant oligarchy and turned both the legislative council and legislative assembly against him and open rebellion broke out against Legge in the south of the province.

Legge was recalled to London in 1776 due to the complaints against him. The Board of Trade in London founding him "wanting" in "that Gracious and Conciliating Deportment which the delicacy of the times and the Tempers of Men under agitation & alarm more particularly demanded". The new Colonial Secretary, Lord George Germain, was concerned that "the Province will be lost, utterly lost" due to Legge's actions in alienating Nova Scotians and possibly losing the province to the rebellious colonies during the American Revolution. A decision was made to replace him with a more conciliatory administrator, Mariot Arbuthnot. Legge was not permitted to return to Nova Scotia but remained governor in name only until 1782.

In 1775, Legge was granted permission to form the Royal Nova Scotia Volunteer Regiment, of which he became the colonel. Due to his unpopularity very few men were willing to be recruited, and the unit languished until the later years of the war. He remained colonel in absentia until 1782.

References

Further reading 
 Viola F. Barnes.  Francis Legge, Governor of Loyalist Nova Scotia 1773–1776. The New England Quarterly. 1930.

1719 births
1783 deaths
Governors of the Colony of Nova Scotia
British Army personnel of the Seven Years' War
46th Regiment of Foot officers
55th Regiment of Foot officers